CS Lewis Nature Reserve is a   nature reserve in Risinghurst, a suburb of Oxford in Oxfordshire. It is managed by the Berkshire, Buckinghamshire and Oxfordshire Wildlife Trust.

This reserve, which was formerly owned by the writer of children's books C. S. Lewis, has a flooded clay pit, with many aquatic plants, toads, dragonflies and damselflies. There is also a steeply sloping wood with large boulders.

References

Berkshire, Buckinghamshire and Oxfordshire Wildlife Trust